Dhamdaha Assembly constituency is an assembly constituency in Purnia district in the Indian state of Bihar. Lesi Singh is the current MLA from Dhamdaha.

Overview
As per Delimitation of Parliamentary and Assembly constituencies Order, 2008, No 61. Dhamdaha Assembly constituency is composed of the following:
Dhamdaha community development blocks; Banbhag Chunapur, Bithnouli Khemchand East, Bithnouli Khemchand West, Ganeshpur, Gangaili, Gowasi, Kajha, Majra, Parora, Rahuwa, Sahara, Satkodariya, Gokulpur, Jagni and Pothia Rampur of Krityanand Nagar CD Block. Around 2010, local people had reinnovated  Hanuman temple situated at the main road and it very soon caught eyes of nearby localities. The subdivision also has notable theater "Chitralaya". Dhamdaha High school one of the oldest has reputation of giving notable officers to the state and country.

Dhamdaha Assembly constituency is part of No 12 Purnia (Lok Sabha constituency).

Members of Legislative Assembly

Election results

2020

References

External links
 

Assembly constituencies of Bihar
Politics of Purnia district